Sasa Brüning (born 24 December 1994) is a Dutch woman cricketer. She made her international debut at the 2013 ICC Women's World Twenty20 Qualifier.

References

External links 
 
 Profile at CricHQ

1994 births
Living people
Dutch women cricketers
Netherlands women Twenty20 International cricketers